Charalampos (Haris) Tzoulis (born December 12, 1979 in Athens, Greece) is a Professor of Neurology and Neurogenetics. He is a trained neurologist and co-director of the Neuro-SysMed Center for Clinical Trials Research in neurological diseases, at the University of Bergen and Haukeland University Hospital, funded amongst others by the Norwegian Research Council. In 2022, he established the K.G. Jebsen Center for Translational Research in Parkinson's Disease at the University of Bergen, with funding from the K.G. Jebsen Foundation, focusing on better diagnostics and identification of disease subtypes in order to offer personalized treatments.

Background 
In 2010 Prof. Tzoulis obtained his PhD at the University of Bergen with a project on Clinical and molecular studies of Mitochondrial DNA polymerase gamma (POLG) associated disease. Tzoulis is professor in neurology and neurogenetics at the Department of Clinical Medicine at the University of Bergen, with an appointment at Haukeland University Hospital. As a clinical neurologist, Prof. Tzoulis is an expert on movement disorders and neurodegeneration, including dementia and parkinsonism. He leads the research group "Neuromics", which focuses on exploring the role of mitochondrial dysfunction in Parkinson's Disease with the aim to improve patient diagnosis and develop neuroprotective therapies. Amongst others, he has received a Career Grant from the Western Norway Regional Health Authority (2014-2018), a career fellowship from the Trond Mohn Foundation (2017-2021), and several awards for excellent research (e.g., Falch Research Prize in 2018).

Neuro-SysMed 
Prof. Tzoulis is Neuro-SysMed's co-director, Head of Neurodegeneration Research and Principal Investigator for Parkinson's Disease.

References 

1979 births
Scientists from Athens
Greek neurologists
21st-century Greek physicians
Academic staff of the University of Bergen
Parkinson's disease researchers
University of Bergen alumni
Greek emigrants to Norway
Living people